American rock band Sevendust has released 13 studio albums, one live album, two compilation albums, 36 singles, five promotional singles and 25 music videos.

Albums

Studio albums

Live albums

Compilation albums

Video albums

Singles

Promotional singles

Guest appearances

Music videos

References

External links
 Official website
 Sevendust at AllMusic
 

Discography
Heavy metal group discographies
Discographies of American artists